Rhasis is a genus of plant bugs in the tribe Mirini.

References

External links 
 

Miridae genera
Mirini